1977 in professional wrestling describes the year's events in the world of professional wrestling.

List of notable promotions 
Only one promotion held notable shows in 1977.

Calendar of notable shows

Awards and honors

Pro Wrestling Illustrated

Championship changes

EMLL

NWA

Births

Date of birth uncertain:
Prince Nana 
 January 7 - Dustin Diamond (died in 2021) 
 January 16 – Máscara Año 2000 Jr.
 January 17 – Kevin Fertig
 February 15 - Gran Naniwa (died in 2010) 
 February 20 – Gail Kim
 February 24 - Floyd Mayweather Jr.
 February 28 - Lance Archer  
 February 28 - Aaron Aguilera 
 March 8 - Michael Tarver
 March 20:
Caprice Coleman 
Homicide
 March 24 – Inquisidor
 March 26 – Sylvain Grenier
 March 31 - Allison Danger 
 April 4 - Stephan Bonnar (died in 2022) 
 April 13 – Christian York
 April 20 - Jon Hugger 
 April 23 – John Cena
 April 29 – Titus O'Neil
 May 9 – Averno
 May 11 – Bobby Roode
 May 23 – Alan Stone
 May 25 – Alberto Del Rio
 June 1 - James Storm 
 June 2 – A.J. Styles
 June 25 – Layla El
 June 26 – Mark Jindrak
July 5:
Kei Sato
Shu Sato
 July 12 – Brock Lesnar
 July 19 - Tony Mamaluke
 July 21 - Sara Calaway 
 August 1 – Yoshi Tatsu 
 August 4 – Frankie Kazarian
 August 31 – Jeff Hardy
 September 1 - Jeremy Lopez
 September 4 – Awesome Kong
 September 5:
Sin Cara
Minoru Fujita 
 September 7 – Molly Holly
 September 8 - X-Fly
 September 11 - Josette Bynum 
 September 25 - Atsushi Aoki (died in 2019)
 October 3 - Danny Basham 
 October 20 - Steve Anthony 
 November 15 -Cima 
 November 20 – Dan Engler
 December 12 - The Butcher
 December 14 - Brain Damage (died in 2012)
 December 18 - The Messiah
 December 28 - Xavier (died in 2020)

Debuts
 Uncertain debut date
 Michael Hayes
 Moondog Spot 
 One Man Gang 
 August 10 - Hulk Hogan
 October 23 - Bad News Brown

Retirements
 Penny Banner (1954 - 1977)
 Octavio Gaona (1934-1977)

Deaths
January 28 - George Bollas, 53
March 15 - Antonino Rocca, 55
July 28 - Bull Ortega, 55 
August 27 - Billy Riley, 81
September 27 - Roy Welch, 75
October 8 - Joe Greenstein, 84

References

 
professional wrestling